Watsonosteus is an extinct genus of coccosteid arthrodire placoderm from the Late Givetian stage of the Middle Devonian period. Fossils are found in the Orkney Islands, Scotland. It is one of the few arthrodires for which complete body fossils are known.

Phylogeny
Watsonosteus is a member of the family Coccosteidae, which belongs to the clade Coccosteomorphi, one of the two major clades within Eubrachythoraci. The cladogram below shows the phylogeny of Watsonosteus:

References

Coccosteidae
Givetian life
Fossils of Scotland
Animals described in 1932